The Marlborough gems were a large collection of jewels (cameos and intaglios) assembled by several Dukes of Marlborough. The collection was composed of more than 730 carved gemstones, including garnets, sapphires, emeralds and many cameos. The most famous cameo, and the Duke's favourite, was 'The Marriage of Cupid and Psyche'. A comprehensive catalogue was published in 1870 by Nevil Story Maskelyne. He made impressions and electrotypes, now in the Beazley Archive in Oxford, which have been published. 

The Marlborough gems were sold by the 7th Duke of Marlborough at auction in 1875 to raise money for the maintenance of Blenheim Palace, the ancestral home.

References

Gemstones